Adam Donovan is an Australian musician and is one of the original members in the Australian band Augie March.

He was born in Shepparton, Victoria, and attended St Brendan's Primary School, Shepparton and Notre Dame High School, Shepparton.

He attended a music course at Northern Melbourne Institute of TAFE along with fellow Augie March founding members Edmondo Ammendola and David Williams.

References

External links

Living people
Year of birth missing (living people)
People from Shepparton
Australian indie pop musicians
Australian indie rock musicians